Cashmere High School is a state coeducational secondary school, located in southern Christchurch, New Zealand. It was opened in 1956 in response to population growth in southern Christchurch during the 1950s.

The school is located in the suburb of Cashmere, New Zealand, on the northern bank of the Heathcote River overlooked by the Cashmere Hills.

History
The Cabinet approved construction of Cashmere High School on 15 March 1954. Tender for the construction of the school, initially accommodating 600 pupils, opened on 1 June 1954 and closed on 6 July. After the initial tenders were rejected and fresh tenders were called, construction was let in late October to P. Graham and Sons Ltd for £170,000. Construction of the school began on 26 October 1954. Terry McCombs, a former Member of the New Zealand House of Representatives who had served as Minister of Education from 1947 to 1949, was appointed as the school's foundation headmaster in August 1955.

Cashmere High School opened to students on 1 February 1956, with an initial intake of 190 third-form (now Year 9) students. The school was officially opened on 29 November 1956 by Minister of Education Ronald Algie.

Cashmere suffered moderate damage in the 22 February 2011 Christchurch earthquake, mainly from liquefaction. On the day, the school had closed for instruction for the day at 12:00 pm due to the Post Primary Teachers' Association, the main secondary school teachers' trade union, holding a paid union meeting that afternoon, meaning very few students and staff were on site when the quake struck at 12:51 pm. The school reopened on 14 March after the school buildings were inspected and deemed safe, and essential repairs and temporary fixes had been carried out. In the aftermath of the earthquake, the school played host to Linwood College in a site sharing agreement while Linwood's severely damaged facilities were inspected and repaired. Cashmere used the site in the morning, while Linwood used the site in the afternoon for five months, until Linwood College moved back to its original site on 1 August.

The current principal, Joe Eccleton, replaced Mark Wilson in July 2019.

Enrolment
Cashmere operates an enrolment scheme to help curb roll numbers and prevent overcrowding. The school's home zone, in which students residing are automatically entitled to be enrolled without rejection, covers the southern suburbs of Christchurch as well as the settlements around the western and southern shores of Lyttelton Harbour. Suburbs and towns within the zone include Beckenham, Cashmere, Huntsbury, Murray Aynsley, Saint Martins, Somerfield, Spreydon, Sydenham, and Westmorland; parts of Addington and Hoon Hay; Hillsborough, Opawa and Waltham west of State Highway 76; and Governors Bay, Diamond Harbour, and Port Levy. Students residing outside the zone are accepted as roll places allow per the enrolment scheme order of preference and secret ballot.

At the October 2013 Education Review Office (ERO) review, Cashmere had 1666 students enrolled, including 46 international students. There was an even number of male and female students. Seventy-five percent of students identified as New Zealand European (Pākehā), nine percent as Māori, three percent each as Asian, and Pacific Islanders, and ten percent as another ethnicity.

Academics
Cashmere High School operates a regular timetable with five 55-minute teaching periods per day, except on Wednesdays where teaching periods are only 50 minutes each.

In Year 9, English, Mathematics, Science, Social Studies, Physical Education and Health are compulsory and are studied for the whole year, while students rotate through four Technology subjects: Design Technologies, Graphic Communication, Materials and Electronics and Control, and Food Technology, studying one of them per school term. Students choose two Arts options out of Visual Art, Drama and Music to study for two terms each, and a Foreign Language option out of French, Japanese, Te Reo Māori and Spanish. There are no optional subjects.

In Year 10, English, Mathematics, Science, Social Studies, Physical Education and Health remain compulsory subjects. Students elect between two and four optional subjects to fill the two remaining subject lines on their timetable – either two full-year subjects, a full-year and two half-year subjects, or four half-year subjects.

In Years 11 to 13, students complete the National Certificate of Educational Achievement (NCEA), the main secondary school qualification in New Zealand. Levels 1, 2 and 3 of NCEA are usually completed in years 11, 12 and 13 respectively, although students can choose subjects from different levels depending on their progress through the NCEA level system. Students study six subjects per year (five in Year 13), with English being compulsory in Years 11 and 12, and Mathematics and Science being compulsory in Year 11.

In 2013, 91.4 percent of students leaving Cashmere High held at least NCEA Level 1, 79.6 percent held at least NCEA Level 2, and 54.0 percent held at least University Entrance. This compares nationally to 85.2%, 74.2%, and 49.0% respectively.

Conductive education
The school has a conductive education unit, which opened in 2002, and caters for up to 20 secondary school-aged students.

Co-curricular

School houses
Cashmere has six school houses into which students are grouped, each is named after a notable New Zealander.

Notable alumni

 Ben Campbell – member of the band "Zed" and later Atlas
 Greg Draper – football (soccer) player 
 Guyon Espiner – TV personality and political editor for TVNZ 
 Stephen Fleming – cricketer
 Alex Frame – track cyclist
 Mike Gilchrist – runner that represented NZ at Commonwealth games in 1986 
 Lucy Gray – climate change activist (not an alumna but a current student)
 Nathan King – member of the band "Zed"
 Steve McCabe (1980 -1984) – songwriter / musician notable for work with The Axemen in Christchurch and solo and collective work elsewhere in New Zealand and across the world.
 Adrian Palmer – member of the band "Zed"
 Bob Parker (–1970) – Mayor of Christchurch (2007–13)
 Bic Runga (1989–93) – singer
 Ethan Rusbatch (2005–09) – basketball player
 Jack Tame, TV and radio host
 Yulia Townsend – singer 
 Richard Wilson – football (soccer) player 
 Luke Di Somma – lyricist, composer, writer and director
 Susan Wakefield (foundation pupil) – tax expert, philanthropist

References

External links
Education Review Office (ERO) reports

Educational institutions established in 1956
1956 establishments in New Zealand
Secondary schools in Christchurch
Conductive education schools
Special schools in New Zealand